Vítor Marcolino da Silva (20 February 1909 – 21 July 1982) was a Portuguese footballer. Listed by Benfica, as one of the club's best forwards in history, Silva represented the club on 131 official games, scoring 108 goals.

Club career
Born in Lisbon, Silva represented Club Internacional de Foot-ball in his early teens, but as club stopped competing; he moved to Hóquei CP, and later Carcavelinhos. In 1927, Benfica made his first paid transfer, when they paid for Silva move. He made his debut on 8 April 1928 in a loss against Sporting.

First deployed as an outside forward, he was quickly moved to the center, where his goalscoring abilities made him famous, using the flying header as trademark. Over the next seasons, he won three Campeonato de Portugal, the club first Primeira Liga, assuming captain armband from 1931 to 1934. He retired at only 27 years old, due to a thrombophlebitis, with a match in his honor on 13 September 1937 against Sporting.

Silva returned to his day job of coachtrimmer, also collaborating with Benfica football section for many years.

International career
Silva had 19 caps for Portugal, scoring 8 goals. His first cap came at only 18, on 8 January 1928 in a 2–2 draw with Spain in Lisbon. The highlight of his international career was his presence at the 1928 Football Olympic Tournament, where he played in all the three matches, scoring three goals, one in each of them and being the top scorer for Portugal, who was eliminated at the quarter-finals by Egypt, due to a 1–2 loss. He represented the national team for the last time in a 1–3 loss to Germany in Lisbon on 27 February 1936, in a friendly game.

International goals

Honours
Benfica
Primeira Divisão: 1935–36
Campeonato de Portugal: 1929–30, 1930–31, 1934–35
Campeonato de Lisboa: 1932–33

References
General
 

Specific

External links
 
 

1909 births
1982 deaths
Portuguese footballers
Portugal international footballers
Olympic footballers of Portugal
Footballers at the 1928 Summer Olympics
Atlético Clube de Portugal players
S.L. Benfica footballers
Association football forwards